Raven Sinclair (Ótiskewápíwskew) is Cree/Assinniboine/Saulteaux and a member of Gordon First Nation of the Treaty#4 area of southern Saskatchewan and member of the Faculty of Social Work at the University of Saskatchewan. She is a survivor and expert on the Sixties Scoop, the practice of taking Indigenous children from their families and placing them in foster care or adopting them out to white families. She is a critic of the current child welfare system in Canada, especially as it relates to Indigenous peoples. She is a professor, film maker, author and facilitator. Sinclair is also a founding editorial member of IndigenousVoices in Social Work (UHawaii), and a regional editor for AlterNative: An International Journal of Indigenous Peoples.

Education
Sinclair began studies at the undergraduate level at the University of Toronto in 1981. She went on to study at First Nations University in the bachelor of Indian social work program. At that time it was the only post-secondary program taking an Indigenous approach. She holds a Master of Social Work from the University of Toronto and PhD from the University of Calgary.

Career
Sinclair is a full professor at the Faculty of Social Work at the University of Regina. She has published on the "Sixties scoop," with her work being cited by publications such as The Canadian Encyclopedia, and has appeared on programs such as CBC's "The National."

Sinclair produced the film A Truth to be Told: The 60's Scoop in the Splatsin Community in 2016. The film examines the idea of "child saving" and the impacts on Indigenous peoples and the child welfare system in Canada with a focus on the story of the Splatsin band’s (Shuswap) experience of child welfare removals in the 1960s and 70s.

She was an executive producer of the 2018 drama film Trouble in the Garden.

Selected publications

References

Living people
First Nations women
Academic staff of the University of Saskatchewan
University of Calgary alumni
Cree people
First Nations activists
Year of birth missing (living people)
Canadian indigenous women academics
First Nations academics
Film producers from Saskatchewan
Canadian women film producers